Abidar Open Air Cinema, one of the biggest outdoor cinemas, was built by mayor Ardavan Nosoudi in 1995 over the Amireih valley in Sanandaj, capital city of Kurdistan Province, Iran. There used to show a movie every Friday.
Until just a few years ago, the only video that could be played in the Abidar cinema was by 35 mm movie projectors and using other sources like TV, DVD, etc. was not possible. The sound was then broadcast through the transmitter, people were listening through radio using FM broadcast band frequency but that was not comfortable because of the audio and video was not synchronize.
Recently it is switched from 35mm film to Digital Cinema projector. 
Using DLP Cinema offers a perfect resolution of 1080*2048 with 1:2000 contrast, in 3D with bright, stunning clarity. 
AIRSCREEN screen surface size is 90x38ft / 27x11 m and distance of facilities from cinema screen is 47m.
Audio is provided by the Community R2 loudspeakers 3-way, triaxial, full-range systems.
Sound can be heard from three hundred meters away
With the amplifier rated at approximately 400 watts and the frequency response 70 Hz to 16 kHz ±1dB, Sound can be heard up to about 300 meter away. 

http://www.irinn.ir/Default.aspx?TabId=55&nid=178962
http://www.ghatreh.com/news/4978214.htm

Cinemas in Iran
Buildings and structures in Kurdistan Province